George P. Schiavelli (June 15, 1948 – August 28, 2019) was a United States district judge of the United States District Court for the Central District of California.

Education and career

Born in Miami Beach, Florida, Schiavelli received an Artium Baccalaureus degree from Stanford University in 1970 and a Juris Doctor from the UCLA School of Law in 1974. He was in private practice in Los Angeles, California from 1974 to 1994 and again from 2000 to 2004, having served as a judge on the State of California Los Angeles Superior Court from 1994 to 2000. He had Italian roots, was president of the Italian American Lawyers Association in 1990.

Federal judicial service

On January 20, 2004, Schiavelli was nominated by President George W. Bush to a seat on the United States District Court for the Central District of California vacated by Lourdes Baird. Schiavelli was confirmed by the United States Senate on June 24, 2004, and received his commission on July 8, 2004. He served in that capacity until his resignation from the bench on October 5, 2008. He then returned to private practice in Los Angeles.

Death

Schiavelli died on August 28, 2019, aged 71.

References

Sources

1948 births
2019 deaths
California state court judges
Judges of the United States District Court for the Central District of California
People from Miami Beach, Florida
Stanford University alumni
Superior court judges in the United States
United States district court judges appointed by George W. Bush
21st-century American judges
UCLA School of Law alumni
American people of Italian descent
20th-century American judges